Muhammad Ali (born 19 June 1933) is a Pakistani boxer. He competed in the men's lightweight event at the 1952 Summer Olympics. At the 1952 Summer Olympics, he lost to Vicente Matute of Venezuela.

References

External links
 

1933 births
Living people
Pakistani male boxers
Olympic boxers of Pakistan
Boxers at the 1952 Summer Olympics
Place of birth missing (living people)
Lightweight boxers
20th-century Pakistani people